The following is a list of science park, technology parks and biomedical parks of the world, organized by continent.

Asia
ASEAN Economic Community
Report listing all the Economic Zones in the ASEAN Economic Community from UNIDO Viet Nam

China
 Shanghai Pudong Software Park (Shanghai)
 Shanghai Zhangjiang Hi-tech Park (aka Zhangjiang Drug Valley) (Shanghai)
 Shenzhen Hi-tech Industrial Park (Shenzhen)
 Suzhou BioBay (Suzhou)
 Suzhou Industrial Park (Suzhou)
 Zhongguancun (aka Beijing Zhong-guan-cun Life Science Park) (Beijing)

Hong Kong
 Cyberport
 Hong Kong Science Park

India
 Genome Valley
 Alexandria Knowledge Park
 Alexandria Center for Science and Innovation
 IKP Knowledge Park
 Rajiv Gandhi Infotech Park
 IIT Madras Research Park
 IIT Bhubaneswar Research & Entrepreneurship Park
 KIIT Technology Business Incubator
 Electropreneur Park Bhubaneswar
 O Hub
 Bhubaneswar City Knowledge Innovation Cluster
 CSRI-IMMT InTEC & CRTDH
 IIT Hyderabad Research Park and Incubation Park ( Both are different areas )

Iran

 Isfahan Science and Technology Town
 Qazvin Science & Technology Park
 Pardis Technology Park
 Kurdistan Science and Technology Town
 Pardis Technology Park
 Science & Technology Park-IASBS
 Khorasan Science and Technology Park 
 Sheikh Bahai Technology Park
 Guilan Science and Technology Park
 Semnan Science and Technology Park - SSTP 
 East Azarbaijan Science and Technology Park 
 Yazd Province Technology Park 
 Markazi Province Technology Park
 Fars Province Technology Park

Israel
 Silicon Wadi
 Startup Village - Yokneam
 Matam - Haifa
 Jerusalem Technology Park
 Har Hotzvim, Jerusalem
 Weizmann Institute of Science, Rehovot
 Tamar Science Park (Rehovot)

Japan
Kansai Science City
 Kyoto Research Park (KRP)
 Tokyo Bay Biotech cluster
Tsukuba Science City
Yokosuka Research Park

Malaysia
 Cyberjaya (near Kuala Lumpur)
 Technology Park Malaysia (Kuala Lumpur)
 Sciences & Arts Innovation Space - SAINS@USM (Universiti Sains Malaysia, Penang)

Pakistan
National Science and Technology Park (NSTP) - Islamabad
 Kahuta Research Laboratories, (Military research complex, Kahuta)
National Institute for Biotechnology and Genetic Engineering, Faisalabad
Arfa Karim Technology Park (former Software Technology Park) - Lahore
IT Media City - Karachi

Philippines
 Light Industry and Science Park of the Philippines II, Laguna
 Science City of Muñoz, Nueva Ecija
 Calamba Premiere International Park

Qatar
 Qatar Science & Technology Park (Doha)

Saudi Arabia

 KAUST Research Park 
 King Abdullah Science Park at KFUPM
 Wadi Makkah 
 Riyadh Techno Valley

Singapore
 Biopolis
 Singapore Science Park (Singapore)

South Korea
Daedeok Science Town
Digital Media City

Taiwan
 Hsinchu Science Park (Hsinchu City)
 Central Taiwan Science Park (Taichung City)
 Southern Taiwan Science Park (Tainan City)
 Tainan Science Park  (Tainan City)

Thailand
 Thailand Science Park (north of Bangkok)
 Prince of Songkla University Science Park 
 Chiangmai University Science Park 
 Khonkean University Science Park

Turkey

 Hacettepe Teknokent (Hacettepe TECHNOPOLIS), (Ankara)
 Yildiz Teknopark, (İstanbul) 
 METU Technopolis (METUTECH), (Ankara) 
 İYTE Teknopark, (İzmir) 
 İ.T.Ü. ARI Teknokent Technology Development Zone, (Istanbul) 
 Teknopark İstanbul, (İstanbul)

Vietnam
Hoa Lac High-Tech Park, Hanoi
Saigon Hi-Tech Park, Ho Chi Minh City
Danang Hi-Tech Park, Da Nang

Europe

Belarus
 Belarus High Technologies Park (Minsk) 
 China-Belarus Industrial Park (Minsk)

Belgium
 Louvain-la-Neuve Science Park
 Arenberg Research-Park
 Aéropole Science Park
 Crealys Science Park
 Al Camino Research Park
Zwijnaarde science park

Bulgaria
 Sofia Tech Park

Czech Republic
 Czech Technology Park (Brno)
 Palacký University Scientific-Technical Park (Olomouc)
 Vědeckotechnický park (Plzeň)

Denmark 
 INCUBA Science Park (Aarhus)
 Scion DTU (Hørsholm near Copenhagen)

Estonia
 Tartu Science Park
 Tallinn Science Park Tehnopol
 PAKRI Science and Industrial Park – Synergy for greentech companies; unique physical environment and testing with PAKRI Smart Industrial City and its own PAKRI Smart Grid 75 MW renewable power network, which combined enables total control of energy prices.

Finland
 Hermia (Tampere)
 Otaniemi Science Park - the largest technology hub in the Nordic countries
 Turku Science Park
 Technology Centre Teknia & Kuopio Science Park (Kuopio)
 Technopolis Group - one of the largest technology center operators in Europe

France
 Paris-Saclay
 Eurasante Bio-business Park (Lille)
 Sophia Antipolis (Nice)
 Villeneuve d'Ascq
 Polygone Scientifique (Grenoble)
 Inovallée (Meylan)

Germany
 Bayer CoLaborator (Berlin)
 Biotechnologiepark Luckenwalde GmbH (Luckenwalde, Brandenburg) 
 Expo Park Hannover (Hannover) 
 Softwarezentrum Böblingen/Sindelfingen - biggest research park focussing on information technology in Europe (Böblingen near Stuttgart) 
 Technologiepark Dortmund (Dortmund) 
 Technologiepark Paderborn (Paderborn) 
 Technologie- und Gewerbezentrum Schwerin/Wismar (Schwerin and Wismar) 
 Technologiezentrum Vorpommern (Greifswald and Stralsund) 
 Technologiezentrum Warnemünde (Rostock-Warnemünde) 
  Innovation Campus Lemgo
 Transferzentrum für angepasste Technologien (Rheine) 
 Triple Z Essen - Gründungs- und Unternehmenszentrum ZukunftsZentrumZollverein (Essen) 
 Weinberg Campus (Halle (Saale))
 WISTA (Science and Technology Park in Berlin-Adlershof)

Hungary
  (Budapest)

Italy
 KILOMETRO ROSSO in (Bergamo, Lombardy, Northern Italy)
 AREA Science Park (Trieste near the Slovenian border)
 Bioindustry Park Silvano Fumero (Canavese near Turin in the north of Italy)
 Erzelli High-Tech Park (Genova near Genoa Airport in the north-west of Italy, on the Mediterranean Sea)
  (Venezia)

Netherlands
Science Park Amsterdam (Amsterdam)
Utrecht Science Park (Utrecht)
Leiden Bio Science Park (Leiden)
Technopolis Delft (Delft)
 HighTech Campus Eindhoven (Eindhoven)
 Science Park Maastricht (Maastricht)
Pivot Park (Oss)

Poland
 Jagiellonian Center of Innovation (Kraków)
Bionanopark (Łódź) 
 Lower Silesian Technology Park T-Park (Dolnośląski Park Technologiczny "T-Park")
 Pomeranian Science and Technology Park (Gdynia) 
 Poznański Park Naukowo-Technologiczny - Poznan Science and Technology Park (Poznań) 
 Startup Hub Poland (Warsaw)
 Szczeciński Park Naukowo-Technologiczny (Szczecin)
 Wrocławski Park Technologiczny, (Wrocław) 
 Bialystok Science and Technology Park

Portugal
 Avepark (Caldas das Taipas) 
 Biocantpark (Cantanhede) 
 Brigantia Eco Park (Bragança) 
 Coimbra iParque
 Feirapark (Porto) 
 Gaia Park (Vila Nova de Gaia) 
 iParque (Coimbra) 
 Instituto Pedro Nunes (Coimbra) 
 Lispólis (Lisboa) 
 Madan Parque de Ciência (Caparica) 
 Madeira Tecnopólo (Funchal) 
 Óbidos Terra Digital (Óbidos)
 Parque de Ciência e Tecnologia da Universidade do Porto (Porto) 
 Parque Tecnológico da Mutela (Almada)
 Polo Tecnológico do Algarve (Faro) 
 Portuspark (Porto) 
 Parkurbis (Covilhã) 
 Régia-Douro Park (Vila Real) 
 Sanjotec (São João da Madeira) 
 Tecmaia (Maia) 
 Tagos Valley (Abrantes) 
 Taguspark (Oeiras)

Russia

Research parks 
 SPbU Research Park (Saint Petersburg)

Technological parks 
 High Technology park IT Park 
 Dubna Technopark 
 Khanty-Mansiisk Technopark 
 Novosibirsk Technopark
 Sarov Technopark 
 IDEA Innovative Technopark in Tatarstan

Special economic zones of technical innovation type 
 Dubna SEZ of Technical Innovation Type
 Saint Petersburg SEZ of Technical Innovation Type
 Tomsk SEZ of Technical Innovation Type
 Zelenograd SEZ of Technical Innovation Type

Innovation centers 
 Skolkovo Innovation Center

Slovakia
 Vedecko-technologicky park Žilina (Žilina) 
 Comenius University Science Park (Bratislava)

Spain
 Parque Tecnológico de Vizcaya (Bilbao)
 Parc de Recerca UAB (Barcelona)
 Barcelona Science Park (Barcelona)
 Barcelona Biomedical Research Park (Barcelona)
Parc Tecnològic del Vallès (Barcelona)
Tecnológico de Boecillo (Valladolid)
Parque Tecnológico de Andalucía (Málaga)
 Cartuja93 (Seville)
 Parque Tecnológico de León (León) 
 Parc Científic i Tecnològic Universitat de Girona (Girona)
 Parque Tecnológico TechnoPark MotorLand (Alcañiz)
 PCiTAL Parc Cientific i Tecnològic de Lleida   (Lleida)
 Parc Científic de la Universitat de València (Valencia)

Sweden
 Ideon Science Park (Lund) 
 Kista Science City (Stockholm) 
 Lindholmen Science Park (Gothenburg)  
 Luleå Science Park  
 Mjärdevi Science Park (Linköping)

United Kingdom

 MSP - Manchester Science Partnerships (Manchester & Alderley Park, Cheshire) 
Adastral Park, (Ipswich)
Bath and Bristol Science Park
 Cambridge Science Park (Cambridge)
 Norwich Research Park (NRP) (Colney, South Norfolk)
 Peel Park (East Kilbride)
 Surrey Research Park
 Wavertree Technology Park (near Liverpool)
 University of Warwick Science Park (Coventry)
 The Surrey Research Park (University of Surrey, Guildford)
 Colworth Science Park
 Harwell Science and Innovation Campus
 Heriot Watt University Research Park (Heriot Watt University), (Edinburgh)

North America

There are approximately 170 university research parks in North America today.

Canada
Alberta
 Edmonton Research Park
 UCalgary University Research Park

British Columbia
 Simon Fraser University Burnaby Mountain Science Park
 University of British Columbia

Ontario
 Blueline Bioscience (Toronto)
 David Johnston Research + Technology Park (Waterloo, Ontario)
 MaRS Discovery District (aka MaRS Center) (Toronto)
 University of Western Ontario Research Parks (London, Ontario)
 Kanata Research Park (Ottawa)
 McMaster Innovation Park (Hamilton, Ontario)
 Cleantech Commons (Trent University, Peterborough) https://cleantechcommons.ca/

Saskatchewan
 Innovation Place Research Park (2 parks: Regina & Saskatoon)

Mexico

Nuevo León
 Parque de Investigación e Innovación Tecnológica, PIIT (Monterrey)

United States

Alabama
 Cummings Research Park (Huntsville)
 UAB Oxmoor
 Tuskegee University Research Park  (Tuskegee)

Arizona
 Arizona State University Research Park
 University of Arizona Science and Tech Park

California
 California Institute for Biomedical Research
 California Institute for Quantitative Biosciences
 California Polytechnic State University (Cal Poly) Technology Park San Luis Obispo
 Bayer CoLaborator (San Francisco)
 Innovation Village Research Park at Cal Poly Pomona
 Stanford Research Park
 UCI Research Park

Connecticut
 Science Park at Yale (New Haven, CT)

Florida
 Central Florida Research Park (Orlando)
 Miami Civic Center (Miami)
 Research Park at Florida Atlantic University (Boca Raton and Deerfield Beach)
 Florida Gulf Coast University Innovation Hub (Fort Myers)
 Innovation Park (Tallahassee)
 Medical City at Lake Nona, (Orlando) 
 Progress Corporate Park (Gainesville)
 Sid Martin Biotechnology Incubator (Alachua)
 Treasure Coast Research Park (Fort Pierce)
 USF Research Park (Tampa)
 Florida Network of Research, Science and Technology Parks
 Foundation Park (Alachua)

Georgia
 Rowen (Atlanta Metro Region)
 Georgia Tech Research Institute (Atlanta)

Illinois
 The Illinois Science & Technology Park (Skokie, IL)
 University Technology Park at IIT (Chicago, IL)
 Research Park at the University of Illinois Urbana-Champaign (Champaign, IL)
 Illinois Technology and Research Corridor
 Southern Illinois University Research Park (Carbondale, IL)

Indiana
 Purdue Research Park (West Lafayette)

Iowa 
 BioVentures Center (University of Iowa)
 Iowa State University Research Park
Kansas

 KU Innovation Park

Kentucky 
 University of Kentucky Coldstream Research Campus

Louisiana
 LSU Innovation Park (Baton Rouge, Louisiana)
 National Cyber Research Park (Bossier City, Louisiana)
 University of New Orleans Research and Technology Park

Maryland
 University of Maryland Research Park (Discovery District) (College Park, MD)
Science & Technology Park at Johns Hopkins (Baltimore, MD)
 University of Maryland BioPark (Baltimore, MD)
 Johns Hopkins University Montgomery County Campus (Rockville, MD)
 bwtech@UMBC Research and Technology Park (Baltimore, MD)

Massachusetts
BioSquare at Boston University (Boston, MA)
LabCentral (Cambridge)
University Park at MIT - Cambridge, MA

Michigan
TechTown at Wayne State University - Detroit, MI
University Corporate Research Park at Michigan State University - Lansing, MI

Minnesota
Minnesota Innovation Park (Formerly Minnesota Innovation Center) In Planning Stages - Minneapolis, MN

Mississippi
The MS e-Center at Jackson State University - Jackson, MS

Montana
 Montana State University Innovation Campus - Bozeman, MT

Nebraska
 Nebraska Technology Park - Lincoln, NE
 Nebraska Innovation Campus - Lincoln, NE

New York
 Rensselaer Technology Park at RPI
 Metrotech Center at New York University Tandon School of Engineering

North Carolina
 Research Triangle Park (Raleigh-Durham)
 University Research Park (University City - Charlotte)
 North Carolina Research Campus (Kannapolis)
 NC State University Centennial Campus (Raleigh)
 Gateway University Research Park (Greensboro, North Carolina)
 University of North Carolina at Chapel Hill - Carolina North Campus (Chapel Hill)
 Wake Forest Innovation Quarter (downtown Winston-Salem)

North Dakota
 North Dakota State University Research Technology Park (Fargo)

Ohio
Miami Valley Research Park, Kettering - in the Greater Dayton area
 Mound Advanced Technology Center Miamisburg, OH
 Russ Research Center, Beavercreek, Ohio - in the Greater Dayton area
Science & Technology Campus Corporation, Columbus, Ohio

Oregon
 Riverfront Research Park, University of Oregon

Pennsylvania
University of Pittsburgh Applied Research Center (U-PARC), Harmarville
Pittsburgh Technology Center, Pittsburgh
Bettis Atomic Power Laboratory, West Mifflin
University City Science Center, Philadelphia
 Innovation Park, State College, Pennsylvania
Spring House Innovation Park, Spring House, Pennsylvania in Lower Gwynedd

South Carolina
Clemson ICAR International Center for Automobile Research, Greenville, South Carolina
Clemson University Innovation Campus and Technology Park (CUICAT), Anderson, South Carolina
The University of South Carolina's Innovista next to The Vista District in downtown, Columbia, South Carolina.
Carolina Research Park, Columbia, SC.

South Dakota
 South Dakota State University Innovation Campus Research Science Technology Park (Brookings)

Texas
 Baylor Research and Innovation Collaborative (Waco)
Research Forest (The Woodlands)
 Rice University-The Ion (Houston)
 Southwest Research Institute (San Antonio)
 Texas A&M University Research Park (College Station)
 Texas Research Park (San Antonio)
 University of Houston Technology Bridge (Houston)
 University of North Texas Research Park (Denton)
 Texas State University Science, Technology, and Advanced Research Park (San Marcos)

Utah
University of Utah Research Park (Salt Lake City, Utah)
 Vivint Innovation Center  (Lehi, Utah)

Virginia
 Fontaine Research Park (Charlottesville)
 University of Virginia Research Park (Charlottesville)
 Virginia Tech Corporate Research Center (Blacksburg)
 Virginia BioTechnology Research Park (Richmond)
 Innovation Technology Park @Prince William (Prince William County)
 Wallops Research Park (Wallops Island)

West Virginia
 West Virginia Regional Technology Park (South Charleston)

Wisconsin
 Milwaukee County Research Park (Wauwatosa, Wisconsin)
 University Research Park at University of Wisconsin–Madison
 Innovation Campus at University of Wisconsin-Milwaukee (Wauwatosa, Wisconsin)

South America

Argentina 
 Parque Industrial Agropecuario y Tecnológico Ciudad de Famaillá Tucumán
 Mendoza TIC Parque Tecnológico
 Parque Biotecnológico y Energías Renovables de la Universidad Nacional de Cuyo
 Parque Tecno-Industrial Albardón
 Parque Tecnológico Industrial y Playa de Transferencia de Cargas
 Parque Industrial y Tecnológico de Villa María
 Parque Industrial y Tecnológico Las Varillas
 Parque Industrial y Tecnológico de Villa Dolores 
 Parque Tecnológico del Litoral Centro S.A.P.E.M.
 Parque Industrial Tecnológico Aeronáutico Morón

Brazil
 (anchor) Biominas Foundation (Belo Horizonte)
 (anchor) Butantan Institute (Sao Paulo)
 (anchor) Oswaldo Cruz Foundation (Rio de Janeiro)

Colombia 
 Parque Tecnológico Guatiguará

Chile 
 Parque Científico y Tecnológico Laguna Carén, University of Chile, (Pudahuel, Santiago)
 Parque Científico y Tecnológico Pacyt Bío Bío, University of Concepción, (Concepción)
 Centro Antártico Internacional, Instituto Antártico Chileno, (Punta Arenas)
 Centro Interdisciplinario de Neurociencia de Valparaíso (Valparaíso)

Panama
 International Technopark of Panama at the City of Knowledge

Oceania

Australia
 Australian Technology Park (Sydney)
 Technology Park Adelaide (Mawson Lakes, South Australia)
 Macquarie Park, Sydney, NSW (including the Research Park - Macquarie University)
 Canberra Technology Park (Canberra)
 Technology Park (Bentley, Western Australia)
Silicon Mallee Adelaide, South Australia
 Innovation Campus
Silicon Mallee Adelaide, South Australia

New Zealand
 Innovation Waikato (Hamilton)
 NZ Central Technology Park (Wellington)

See also
 List of technology centers
 Research-intensive clusters

References

Technology in society
Parks